Events from the year 1667 in Denmark.

Incumbents 

 Monarch - Frederick III

Events

Undated

Births

Full date unknown

Deaths 
 November 12 - Ulrik of Denmark (1578–1624), statesman (born 1598)

Full date unknown

References 

 
Denmark
Years of the 17th century in Denmark